Temur Chogadze (born 5 May 1998) is a Georgian professional footballer who plays as a midfielder for Shakhter Karagandy.

Clubs
Born in Batumi, Chogadze is a product of a youth sportive system of the Saburtalo Tbilisi, where he signed his first professional contract. After playing in the different Erovnuli Liga teams, in January 2020 he was transferred to Ukraine and signed a 1,5 year deal with Olimpik Donetsk.

Chogadze made his debut in the Ukrainian Premier League for FC Olimpik as a start-squad player on 23 February 2020, playing in a losing home match against FC Lviv.

References

External links
 

1998 births
Living people
Sportspeople from Batumi
Footballers from Georgia (country)
Expatriate footballers in Ukraine
Expatriate footballers from Georgia (country)
Expatriate sportspeople from Georgia (country) in Ukraine
Association football midfielders
FC Saburtalo Tbilisi players
FC Metalurgi Rustavi players
FC Dinamo Batumi players
FC Torpedo Kutaisi players
FC Inhulets Petrove players
FC Olimpik Donetsk players
FC Telavi players
Erovnuli Liga players
Ukrainian Premier League players
Georgia (country) youth international footballers
Georgia (country) under-21 international footballers